Reynal is a surname. Notable people with the surname include:

 Arnaldo Orfila Reynal (1897–1997), Argentine-Mexican publisher
 Eugene Reynal (1902–1968), American publisher
 Reynal & Hitchcock, a New York publishing company he co-founded
 Jeanne Reynal (1903–1983), American mosaic artist
 José Reynal-Restrepo (1977–2011), murdered Colombian priest
 Victoire Cogevina Reynal, American-born Greek-Argentine businesswoman

See also
 Raynel Espinal (born 1991), Dominican professional baseball pitcher
 Guillaume Thomas François Raynal (1713–96), French writer